The city of Duluth, overlooking Lake Superior in the U.S. state of Minnesota has several distinct neighborhoods.

Neighborhoods

Central 
Canal Park
Central Hillside
Downtown Duluth
East Hillside
Park Point

Eastern Duluth 
Chester Park / UMD
Congdon Park
East End / Endion
Hunter's Park
Lakeside – Lester Park
Morley Heights / Parkview
North Shore

Above the hill 
Duluth Heights
Kenwood
Piedmont Heights
Woodland

West Duluth 
Bayview Heights
Cody
Denfeld
Fairmount
Irving
Oneota
Spirit Valley

West of West Duluth 
Fond du Lac
Gary – New Duluth
Norton Park
Morgan Park
Riverside
Smithville

Lincoln Park 
Lincoln Park
Goat Hill
Rice’s Point

External links
City of Duluth website
City map of neighborhoods (PDF)
Duluth Interactive Social Media Map

Duluth